Caslano railway station is a railway station in the municipality of Caslano in the Swiss canton of Ticino. The station is on the metre gauge Lugano–Ponte Tresa railway (FLP), between Lugano and Ponte Tresa.

The station has a single platform, which is used by trains operating in both directions.

Services 
 the following services stop at Caslano:

References

External links 
 
 

Caslano
Ferrovie Luganesi stations